Paula Sage (born ) is a Scottish actress, Special Olympics netball player, and advocate for people with Down syndrome.

Early life
Sage was adopted as an infant. Her parents are Alan and Mary Sage. Her father is a university lecturer. She attended primary school and high school in Cumbernauld, and attended the Merkland school in Kirkintilloch.

Career 
Sage's performance in the 2003 British film AfterLife, playing Roberta Brogan, brought her a BAFTA Scotland award for best first time performance and Best Actress in the Bratislava International Film Festival, 2004. Her character is sister to Kevin McKidd's character, and daughter to Lindsay Duncan's. In review, critic Liz Hoggard found "the most remarkable thing about the film is the purity of Sage's performance."

AfterLife also won the Audience Award at the 2005 Edinburgh International Film Festival. It also won Sage a role as Donna McCabe in BBC Scotland's River City soap.

Sage won a silver medal as a member of the British netball team at the Special Olympics. She is an ambassador for Down's Syndrome Scotland and Mencap, and a patron of the Ann Craft Trust. She was the first person with Down syndrome to be a Mencap ambassador. She worked part-time at a travel agency and cafe in Glasgow.

References

External links
 
 Paula Sage interview on Woman's Hour (13 August 2004).
 A 2004 photograph of Paula Sage and Shirley Henderson, at Getty Images.

Actors with Down syndrome
Living people
1980s births
People from Cumbernauld
Scottish netball players
Scottish film actresses
Special Olympics
Scottish soap opera actresses